This is a list of food companies, current and past businesses involved in food production or processing.

Africa 

 All Joy Foods
 Bakers
 BOS Ice Tea
 Cevital
 Choppies
 Clover
 Colcom Foods
 Distell Group Limited
 Famous Brands
 Golden Web
 Kenya Wine Agencies Limited
 Les Domaines Agricoles
 Meat Corporation of Namibia
 Melcom
 Nile Breweries Limited
 Pioneer Foods
 SOMED
 Spur Corporation
 Tiger Brands
 Tilda Uganda
 Tongaat Hulett

Argentina 

 Grupo Arcor
 Havanna
 La Serenísima
 Molinos Río de la Plata
 SanCor

Australia 

 The a2 Milk Company
 Baiada Poultry
 Bakers Delight
 Balfours
 Baskin-Robbins Australia
 Beerenberg Farm
 Bega Cheese
 Bellamy's Australia
 Bickford's Australia
 Boost Juice
 Breadtop
 Bulla Dairy Foods
 Bundaberg Brewed Drinks
 Camperdown Dairy International
 Canberra Milk
 Darrell Lea
 Dick Smith Foods
 Ernest Hillier Chocolates
 Ferguson Plarre Bakehouses
 Frosty Boy
 Haigh's Chocolates
 Huon Aquaculture
 Inghams Enterprises
 Isis Central Sugar Mill
 Lion Dairy & Drinks
 Mrs Mac's Pies
 Murray Goulburn Co-operative
 Norco Co-operative
 Nuttelex
 Patties Foods
 Preshafood
 Retail Food Group
 San Remo Macaroni Company
 Sanitarium
 Schweppes Australia
 So Natural
 Sustagen
 Tassal
 Thomas Foods International
 Three Threes Condiments
 Warrnambool Cheese and Butter
 Weis
 Wendy's Supa Sundaes
 Wesfarmers

Austria 

 Agrana
 Brauerei Ottakringer
 Do & Co
 Julius Meinl
 Manner
 Pez
 Rauch
 Red Bull GmbH

Azerbaijan

 Bahra Biscuit Factory
 Shollar water
 Vinagro

Belgium 

 Anheuser-Busch InBev
 Cavalier Chocolate
 Confiserie Roodthooft
 Delhaize Group
 Duc d'O
 Glacio
 John Martin Brewery
 Jules Destrooper
 Le Pain Quotidien
 Leonidas
 Lotus Bakeries
 Meurens
 Neuhaus
 Vanparys
 Ysco

Brazil 

 Brazilian Fast Food Corporation
 BRF S.A.
 Copacol
 Garoto
 Grupo Petrópolis
 International Meal Company
 JBS S.A.
 Marfrig
 Vigor S.A.

Bulgaria 

 Vitta Foods

Canada 

 Agropur
 Bothwell Cheese
 Canyon Creek Food Company
 Chapman's
 Cott
 Daiya
 Dan-D Foods
 Dare Foods
 Earth's Own Food Company
 Ganong Bros.
 Gay Lea
 George Weston Limited
 Jim Pattison Group
 Just Us!
 Kawartha Dairy Company
 Lassonde Industries
 Laura Secord Chocolates
 Lester's Foods Ltd.
 M&M Food Market
 Maple Leaf Foods
 McCain Foods
 Metro Inc.
 Mike's Hard Lemonade Co.
 MTY Food Group
 Nature's Path
 Naya Waters
 Olymel
 Organic Meadow Cooperative
 Première Moisson
 Premium Brands Holdings Corporation
 Purdy's Chocolates
 Purity Factories
 Recipe Unlimited
 Restaurant Brands International
 Rogers Sugar
 Saputo
 Sobeys
 SunOpta
 Voortman Cookies

Caribbean 

 Nomad Foods

Chile 

 Castaño
 Compañía de las Cervecerías Unidas
 Concha y Toro
 IANSA
 Soprole

China 

 Amoy Food
 Bright Food
 Chaoda Modern Agriculture
 COFCO Group
 Convenience Retail Asia
 Dachan Food
 Dairy Farm International Holdings
 Foshan Haitian Flavouring & Food Co
 Fufeng Group
 Fujian Dali Group
 Global Sweeteners
 Hangzhou Wahaha Group
 Hanwei Group
 Huiyuan Juice
 Kee Wah Bakery
 Kweichow Moutai Company
 La Rose Noire
 Mengniu Dairy
 Shuanghui
 Tien Chun Ve-Tsin
 Ting Hsin International Group
 Uni-President Enterprises Corporation
 Viro
 Want Want
 Xinjiang Chalkis Co.Ltd
 Yili Group
 Yurun Group
 Zoo Holdings Group
 Zvečevo

Colombia 

 Alpina Productos Alimenticios
 Grupo Nutresa
 Postobón
 Quala

Croatia 

 Agrokor
 Atlantic Grupa
 Čakovečki mlinovi
 Franck
 Kandit
 Koestlin
 Kraš
 Podravka
 Vindija
 Zvečevo

Cuba
 José Arechabala S.A.

Denmark 

 Arla Foods
 Carlsberg Group
 Chr. Hansen
 Co-Ro Food
 Danish Agro
 Danish Crown AmbA
 DAVA Foods
 Friis-Holm
 Kohberg Bakery Group
 Knuthenlund
 Løgismose Meyers
 Stauning Whisky
 Toms International

Finland 

 Atria
 Fazer
 HKScan
 Kaslink Foods
 Paulig
 Raisio Group
 Valio

France 

 Alter Eco
 Amorino
 Bel Group
 Biscuiterie Saint-Michel
 Biscuits Fossier
 Bonduelle
 Bongrain
 Bonnat Chocolates
 Castel Group
 Comigel
 Compagnie des Fromages et RichesMonts
 Cooperl Arc Atlantique
 Dalloyau
 Danone
 Daregal
 Debauve & Gallais
 Délifrance
 Fleury Michon
 Groupe Bigard
 Groupe Doux
 Groupe Holder
 Groupe Le Duff
 Groupe Limagrain
 Hédiard
 La Vie Claire
 Lactalis
 Lur Berri
 Menier Chocolate
 Michel et Augustin
 Pernod Ricard
 Picard Surgelés
 The Soufflet Group
 Tereos
 Valrhona

Germany 

 Aldi
 Alnatura
 Asbach Uralt
 August Storck
 Bahlsen
 Born Feinkost
 C. Hahne Mühlenwerke GmbH & Co. KG
 Coppenrath & Wiese
 Dr. Oetker
 Düsseldorfer Löwensenf
 Frosta AG
 Granini
 Halloren Chocolate Factory
 Händlmaier
 Hans Adler
 Haribo
 Intersnack
 Lorenz Snack-World
 Mederer GmbH
 Meica
 Mestemacher
 Müller
 Mymuesli
 Niederegger
 Nordzucker
 Schwarz Gruppe
 Südzucker
 Teekampagne
 Teekanne
 Waldemar Behn
 Wild
 Zott

Greece 

 Arapian
 Evga S.A
 Haitoglou Bros
 Ion
 KYKNOS S.A.
 Melissa S.A.
 Mevgal
 Miran Pastourma
 Papadopoulos
 Terkenlis
 Vivartia

India 

 Adyar Ananda Bhavan
 Amul
 Bisleri
 Banas Dairy
 Bihar State Milk Co-operative Federation
 Britannia Industries
 Dabur
 Dudhsagar Dairy
 Everest Spices
 Haldiram's
 Hatsun Agro Product
 ITC Limited
 Karnataka Milk Federation
 Kerala Co-operative Milk Marketing Federation
 Kerala Solvent Extractions
 Marico
 Meat Products of India
 Mother Dairy
 Orissa State Cooperative Milk Producers' Federation
 Parle Agro
 Parle Products
 Patanjali Ayurved
 Tata Consumer Products

Indonesia 

 ABC Foods
 Delta Djakarta
 Greenfields
 Indofood
 Mayora Indah
 Sariwangi
 Siantar Top
 Wings Food
 Yupi

Ireland 

 Abbey Cheese Company
 Abrakebabra Investments
 Ardsallagh Goat Farm
 Barry's Tea
 Béal Organic Cheese
 Bewley's
 Bluebell Falls
 Burren Smokehouse
 Butlers Chocolates
 C&C Group
 Cahill's Farm Cheese
 Carlow Brewing Company
 Carrigaline Farmhouse Cheese
 Donegal Creameries
 Flahavan's
 Fyffes
 Gleeson Group
 Greencore
 Hadji Bey
 Irwin's Bakery
 Kerry Group
 Lakeland Dairies
 Lyons Tea
 Mauds Ice Creams
 Murphys Ice Cream
 Nobó
 Old Bushmills Distillery
 Ornua
 R&H Hall
 Shamrock Foods
 Tayto (Northern Ireland)
 Tayto (Republic of Ireland)
 Valeo Foods

Israel 

 Angel Bakeries
 Berman's Bakery
 Osem
 Prigat
 Strauss
 Tara
 Yehuda Matzos

Italy 

 Amedei
 Auricchio
 Autogrill
 Dolciaria Balconi
 Balocco
 Barilla Group
 Bartolo Nardini
 Bertagni
 Campari Group
 Carapelli
 Cielo
 Cirio
 Coppola Foods
 De Cecco
 Domori
 Elledi
 Ferrero SpA
 Gelati Cecchi
 Giovanni Rana
 Girolamo Luxardo
 Granarolo
 Grom
 Guglielmo coffee
 Gustobene
 La Molisana
 Lavazza
 Lazzaroni
 Loacker
 Marzadro Distillery
 Massimo Zanetti Beverage Group
 Nardini
 Nonino Grappa
 Parmalat
 Pernigotti
 Polli
 Saclà Italia
 San Carlo
 Sterilgarda
 Venchi
 Vicenzi
 Voiello

Japan 

 Ajinomoto
 Asahi Breweries
 Calbee
 Ezaki Glico
 Fujimitsu Corporation
 Fujiya
 House Foods
 Kabaya
 Kagome
 Kikkoman
 Kirin Company
 LEOC Japan
 Maruchan
 Maruha Nichiro
 Marukome
 Meiji Dairies
 Meiji Seika
 Mizkan
 Morinaga
 Nippon Flour Mills
 Nippon Ham
 Nippon Suisan Kaisha
 Nissin Foods
 Sapporo Brewery
 Shidax
 Snow Brand Milk Products
 Suntory
 Tohato
 Toyo Suisan
 Yakult
 Yamazaki Baking
 Zensho

Kuwait 

 Americana Group
 Kout Food Group

Malaysia 

 BOH Plantations
 Felda Global Ventures Holdings
 The Italian Baker
 Kart's
 Mamee Double-Decker
 Munchy's
 Polar Ice Cream
 Ramly Group
 Sabah Tea
 Sime Darby
 United Plantations
 Yit Foh Tenom Coffee

Mexico 

 Ah Cacao Real Chocolate
 Alpura
 Alsea
 Bachoco
 Búfalo
 Chilchota Alimentos
 Cholula Hot Sauce
 Gruma
 Grupo Anderson's
 Grupo Bimbo
 Grupo La Norteñita
 Grupo Lala
 Ibarra
 Jarritos
 Jose Cuervo
 La Costeña
 Mayordomo
 Sidral Mundet
 Sigma Alimentos
 Valentina

Netherlands 

 Ahold Delhaize
 AVEBE
 Bavaria Brewery
 Douwe Egberts
 Droste
 FrieslandCampina
 Heineken International
 Ketel One
 Lucas Bols
 Nutreco
 Remia
 Royal Wessanen
 Unilever
 Vion NV

New Zealand 

 Alliance Group
 Chelsea Sugar Refinery
 Cookie Time
 Emerson's Brewery
 Evansdale Cheese
 Fonterra
 Foodstuffs
 Foxton Fizz
 Goodman Fielder
 Gregg's
 Healtheries
 Hubbard Foods
 Jimmy's Pies
 Lewis Road Creamery
 Livestock Improvement Corporation
 McCashins Brewery
 Monteith's
 My Food Bag
 Progressive Enterprises
 Restaurant Brands
 Silver Fern Farms
 Speight's
 Synlait
 Talley's Group
 Tatua Dairy Company
 Tegel Foods
 Westland Milk Products
 Whitestone cheese
 Whittaker's
 Wigram Beer
 Zealong

Norway 

 Bama Gruppen
 Brynild Gruppen
 Cermaq
 Coop Norge
 Den Lille Nøttefabrikken
 Drammens Is
 Felleskjøpet
 Fjordland
 Friele
 Gartnerhallen
 Hennig-Olsen Iskremfabrikk
 HOFF Norske Potetindustrier
 Hval Sjokoladefabrikk
 Isklar
 Kavli
 Kavli Trust
 Lerum
 Maarud
 Nora Industrier
 Nortura
 Norway Royal Salmon
 Orkla Group
 SalMar
 Synnøve Finden
 Tine
 Vinmonopolet

Pakistan 

 Dalda
 Engro Corporation
 Fauji Foundation
 Gourmet Foods
 K&N's
 Mitchell's Fruit Farms Limited
 Murree Brewery
 National Foods Limited
 OMORÉ
 Pakola
 Shan Food Industries
 Shezan International
 Mehran spice & Food Industries
 Peek freans

Peru 

 Ajegroup
 Alicorp
 Corporación Lindley S.A.
 Don Jorge
 Enrique Cassinelli and Sons
 La Iberica

Philippines 

 CDO Foodsphere
 Century Pacific Food
 Figaro Coffee Company
 Jollibee
 Liwayway Holdings Company (Oishi)
 Mama Sita's Holding Company
 Max's of Manila
 Monde Nissin
 Republic Biscuit Corporation
 RFM Corporation
 San Miguel Corporation
 San Miguel Food and Beverage
 Serenitea
 SL Agritech Corporation
 Universal Robina

Poland 

 AmRest
 Hortex
 Indykpol
 Kamis
 Maspex
 Tymbark
 Winiary

Portugal 

 Cerealis
 Cofaco
 Conservas Ramirez
 Conserveira do Sul
 Delta Cafés
 Frulact
 Grupo RAR
 Lactogal
 Sovena Group
 Sumol + Compal
 Valouro

Russia 

 Babayevsky
 Cherkizovo
 Inmarko
 Krasny Oktyabr
 Rot Front
 Wimm-Bill-Dann Foods

Saudi Arabia 

 Almarai
 Nadec
 Savola Group

Serbia 

 Bambi
 BIP Brewery
 Imlek a.d.
 Knjaz Miloš a.d.
 La Fantana
 Mlekara Subotica
 Nectar d.o.o.
 Rubin
 Štark
 Swisslion Group
 Zaječarsko pivo

Singapore 

 Aalst Chocolate
 ABR Holdings
 Asian Home Gourmet
 Ayam Brand
 Bee Cheng Hiang
 Bengawan Solo
 BreadTalk
 Killiney Kopitiam
 Tee Yih Jia
 Udders
 Ya Kun Kaya Toast
 Yeo Hiap Seng
 Wilmar International

South Korea 

 CJ Group
 Crown Confectionery
 Doosan Corporation
 Hollys
 Jeongin Food
 Korea Tobacco & Ginseng Corporation
 Lotte Confectionery
 Nongshim
 Orion Confectionery
 Ottogi
 Pulmuone
 Samyang Food
 Seoul Milk
 SPC Group
 Sulbing
 Tory Food
 Yeolmae Food

Spain 

 BEHER
 Borges Mediterranean Group
 Calidad Pascual
 Campofrío Food Group
 Ebro Foods
 Galletas Gullón
 Grupo Calvo
 Kalise Menorquina
 Mahou-San Miguel Group
 Nutrexpa
 Pescanova
 Quely
 San Nicasio
 Ta-Tung

Sri Lanka 

 Cargills (Ceylon) PLC
 Ceylon Biscuits Limited
 Ceylon Cold Stores
 Daintee
 Harischandra Mills
 Maliban Biscuit Manufactories Limited
 Pelwatte Sugar Industries PLC

Sweden 

 AarhusKarlshamn
 Abba Seafood
 Arla Foods
 Cloetta
 Findus
 Gunnar Dafgård
 Lantmännen
 Mackmyra Whisky
 Norrmejerier
 Pågen
 Polarbröd
 Roberts
 Wasabröd

Switzerland 

 Barry Callebaut
 Bell Food Group
 Cailler
 Chiquita Brands International
 Coffee World
 Confiserie Sprüngli
 Coop
 Delica
 Emmi AG
 Franches-Montagnes Brewery
 Hero Group
 La Clandestine Absinthe
 Lindt & Sprüngli
 Max Felchlin
 Migros
 Nestlé
 Ricola
 Rivella
 Schweizer Getraenke AG, Obermeilen
 Tetra Laval
 Tropenhaus Frutigen
 Unser Bier
 Villars-Maitre-Chocolatier

Taiwan 

 Dachan Food
 HeySong Corporation
 Hsin Tung Yang
 Kimlan Foods
 Kuo Yuan Ye
 Ting Hsin International Group
 Tingyi (Cayman Islands) Holding Corporation
 Uni-President Enterprises Corporation
 Want Want
 Wei-Chuan Food Corporation

Thailand 

 Boon Rawd Brewery
 Charoen Pokphand Foods
 Est Cola
 Khon Kaen Sugar
 Minor International
 Mitr Phol
 Osotspa
 Red Bull
 Tao Kae Noi
 Thai President Foods
 Thai Union Group
 ThaiBev

Trinidad and Tobago 

 Bermudez Biscuit Company
 Carib Brewery
 Flavorite Ice Cream
 House of Angostura
 K.C. Confectionery Limited
 Kiss Baking Company Limited
 S. M. Jaleel and Company
 Solo Beverage Company

Turkey 

 A101
 Apikoğlu
 Banvit
 Efes Beverage Group
 Gulsan
 Kristal Kola
 Mado
 TEKEL
 Tekel Birası
 Ülker
 Yıldız Holding

Ukraine 

 Chumak
 Khortytsia
 Konti Group
 Kremenchukm'yaso
 Nemiroff
 Obolon
 Roshen
 Sandora
 Svitoch
 Yarych Confectionery
 ZhL

United Kingdom 

 2 Sisters Food Group
 A. E. Rodda & Son
 A.G. Barr
 A. L. Simpkin & Co. Ltd
 Antonelli Bros Ltd
 Associated British Foods
 Bakkavör
 Bates Dairy
 Baxters
 Ben's Cookies
 Benugo
 Bernard Matthews Ltd
 Bompas & Parr
 Booker Group
 Brace's Bakery
 Brains Brewery
 Britvic
 Burton's Biscuit Company
 Charbonnel et Walker
 Clark's Pies
 Co-op Food
 Compass Group
 Connoisseur's Bakery
 Cook Trading
 Cooplands
 Cranswick plc
 Dairy Crest
 Delamere Dairy
 Devro
 Dietary Foods Ltd
 Divine Chocolate
 Druckers Vienna Patisserie
 F. Duerr & Sons
 Fiendish Feet
 First Milk
 Fivemiletown Creamery
 Fox's Confectionery
 Gelato Italia
 Ginsters
 Goldenfry
 Graze
 Greene King
 Grodzinski Bakery
 Gü
 Higgidy
 Hope and Greenwood
 Hovis
 HR Bradfords
 Irwin's Bakery
 Jordans
 Konditor & Cook
 Lion Capital LLP
 Lloyd Maunder
 Loch Duart
 Mackie's
 McCowan's
 Metcalfe's Food Company
 Michton
 Millie's Cookies
 Moo Free Limited
 Mornflake
 Neal's Yard Dairy
 Oakhouse Foods
 Peter's Food Services
 Plum Baby
 Pork Farms
 Pukka Herbs
 Pukka Pies
 Premier Foods
 Princes Group
 Quiggin's
 R&R Ice Cream
 Rakusen's
 The Restaurant Group
 Riverford
 Roadchef
 Rowse Honey
 SABMiller
 Sainsbury's
 Samworth Brothers
 Sayers
 Scotty Brand Ltd
 Skinny Candy
 Slimming World
 Square Pie
 SSP Group
 Stoats Porridge Bars
 Swizzels Matlow
 Tangerine Confectionery
 Tate & Lyle
 Tesco
 Tunnock's
 Tyrrells
 Ummah Foods
 Vestey Group
 Waitrose
 Walkers' Nonsuch
 Walkers Shortbread
 Warburtons
 Warrens Bakery
 Welcome Break
 Whitbread
 Whitby Seafoods Ltd
 Wilkin & Sons
 William Jackson Food Group
 Wrights Pies
 Yeo Valley

United States

Bakery 

 Alvarado Street Bakery
 Arizmendi Bakery
 Avalon International Breads
 Big Apple Bagels
 Blue Chip Cookies
 Boudin Bakery
 Breadsmith
 Carlo's Bake Shop
 Cavanagh Company
 The Claxton Bakery
 Collin Street Bakery
 Crumbs Bake Shop
 Flowers Foods
 Great Harvest Bread Company
 Italian Peoples Bakery
 King's Hawaiian
 Kossar's Bialys
 Levain Bakery
 Liz Lovely
 Martin's Famous Pastry Shoppe, Inc.
 Mrs. Fields
 Orwasher's bakery
 Racine Danish Kringles
 Schmidt Baking Company
 Semifreddi's Bakery
 Sprinkles Cupcakes
 Sunbeam Bread
 United States Bakery
 Voodoo Doughnut
 Westminster Cracker Company

Cereal & grain 

 The Andersons
 Archer Daniels Midland
 Bob's Red Mill
 Bunge Limited
 Cargill
 CHS Inc.
 ContiGroup Companies
 Fuji Food
 Gavilon
 Kellogg's
 King Arthur Flour
 Kuli Kuli, Inc.
 The Leavitt Corporation
 Little Crow Foods
 Love Grown Foods
 Magnolia Bakery
 MFA Incorporated
 Peanut Butter & Co.
 POET
 Riceland Foods
 Two Degrees Food
 U.S. Mills
 United Cooperative

Confectionery 

 Kraft Heinz
 Mars, Incorporated
 Mondelez International
 The Hershey Company
 Amano Artisan Chocolate
 American Licorice Company
 Annabelle Candy Company
 Askinosie Chocolate
 Boyer Brothers
 Brach's
 Brown and Haley
 Carolina Foods
 Chagrin Falls Popcorn Shop
 Chocolove
 Dagoba Chocolate
 Dan's Chocolates
 Dylan's Candy Bar
 Friesinger's Candies
 Georgetown Cupcake
 Gertrude Hawk Chocolates
 Giambri's Quality Sweets
 Goetze's Candy Company
 Guittard Chocolate Company
 Idaho Candy Company
 Impact Confections
 Jelly Belly
 Joyva
 Just Born
 Kellogg's
 Mast Brothers
 Marich Confectionery
 Reed's Candy
 Rocky Mountain Chocolate Factory
 Sanders Confectionery
 Sarris Candies
 Scharffen Berger Chocolate Maker
 Schimpff's Confectionery
 See's Candies
 Smarties Candy Company
 Somebody's Mother's Chocolate Sauce
 Spangler Candy Company
 Taza Chocolate
 TCHO
 Unreal Brands
 The Warrell Corporation
 Whetstone Chocolates
 Whitman's

Dairy 

 All American Foods
 Alpenrose Dairy
 Aurora Organic Dairy
 BelGioioso Cheese
 Bittersweet Plantation Dairy
 Blue Bell Creameries
 Brewster Dairy
 Byrne Dairy
 Cabot Creamery
 Cal-Maine
 Cass-Clay
 Chaseholm Farm Creamery
 Clover Stornetta Farms
 Cowgirl Creamery
 Crystal Creamery
 Cypress Point Creamery
 Dairy Farmers of America
 Darigold
 DCI Cheese Company
 Dean Foods
 Ellsworth Cooperative Creamery
 Galliker's
 Gossner Foods
 Grafton Village Cheese Company
 Happy Cow Creamery
 Hershey Creamery Company
 Hilmar Cheese Company
 Horizon Organic
 HP Hood
 Joseph Gallo Farms
 Junket
 Land O'Lakes
 Leprino Foods
 Lifeway Foods
 Marin French Cheese Company
 Maytag Dairy Farms
 Murray's Cheese
 Nature's Harmony Farm
 Organic Valley
 Penn State University Creamery
 Pierre's Ice Cream Company
 Point Reyes Farmstead Cheese Company
 Prairie Farms Dairy
 Rogue Creamery
 Sargento
 Schoep's Ice Cream
 Schreiber Foods
 Shamrock Farms
 Siggi's Dairy
 Smiling Hill Farm
 SmithFoods
 Straus Family Creamery
 Sunshine Dairy
 Sweet Grass Dairy
 Tillamook County Creamery Association
 United Dairy Farmers
 Vermont Creamery
 Wainwright Dairy
 Winchester Cheese Company
 Winder Farms
 Wisconsin Cheeseman
 Yancey's Fancy
 Yarnell Ice Cream Co.

Drink 
 Brown-Forman

Foods distribution & retail 

 Albertsons
 Dollar General
 Dollar Tree
 Kroger
 Publix
 Target Corporation
 The Home Depot
 Reyes Holdings
 Saladino's Inc
 SuperValu
 Lowe's
 Walmart
 Walgreens Boots Alliance
 Macy's, Inc.
 Winn Dixie
 Food Lion
 The Giant Company

Foods processing (not frozen) 

 Kraft Heinz
 Bruce Foods
 General Mills
 Catterton Partners
 Cherrybrook Kitchen
 Colavita
 Cuisine Solutions
 Deep Foods
 Eden Foods Inc.
 Goya Foods
 Gustobene
 Isaly's
 Krinos Foods
 Kronos Foods
 La Loma Foods
 Luck's Incorporated
 Manischewitz
 Newman's Own
 Rhee Bros., Inc.
 Richelieu Foods
 Rosa Food
 Sclafani Foods
 Seneca Foods
 Streit's
 Tabatchnick

Frozen foods 

 Tyson Foods
 Bellisio Foods
 Captain Ken's Foods
 Edwards Baking
 Fred's Frozen Foods
 K&N's Foods USA 
 Mrs. T's Pierogies
 Pero Family Farms Food Company
 Reser's Fine Foods
 Rhino Foods
 Ruiz Foods
 Schwan Food Company

Fruits & vegetables processing 

 The Bauman Family
 Blue Diamond Growers
 Buddy Fruits
 Calavo Growers
 Del Monte Foods
 Dole Food Company
 Driscoll's
 Franklin Baker Company
 Fresh Del Monte Produce
 Frieda's Inc.
 Hollandia Produce
 Idahoan Foods
 Limoneira
 Maui Pineapple Company
 The Morning Star Company
 Ocean Spray
 Organically Grown Company
 Pero Family Farms Food Company
 Simple and Crisp
 Sunkist Growers, Incorporated
 Taylor Farms
 Turbana
 Wish Farms

Meats processing 

 Boar's Head Provision Company
 Burgers' Smokehouse
 Columbus Salame
 Dakota Beef
 Daniele, Inc.
 D'Artagnan
 Dietz & Watson
 Empire Kosher
 Foster Farms
 Hatfield Quality Meats
 Heritage Foods USA
 Hormel
 Kansas City Steak Company
 Kiolbassa Sausage
 Koch Foods
 Koegel Meat Company
 Lobel's of New York
 Marathon Enterprises, Inc.
 Molinari's
 National Beef Packing Company
 Niman Ranch
 Norbest
 Nueske's Applewood Smoked Meats
 Omaha Steaks
 Parker House Sausage Company
 Pat LaFrieda Meat Purveyors
 Perdue Farms
 Plumrose USA
 Robertson's Hams
 Tallgrass Beef Company
 Tyson Foods
 Usinger's
 Zacky Farms

Restaurant 
 Chipotle Mexican Grill
 Domino's Pizza
 McDonald's
 Starbucks
 The Wendy's Company
 Yum! Brands

Snack foods 

 Axium Foods
 General Mills
 Blair's Sauces and Snacks
 Casa Sanchez Foods
 Charles Chips
 Kraft Heinz
 Elmer's Fine Foods
 Golden Flake
 J & J Snack Foods
 Jel Sert
 Kellogg's
 Martin's Potato Chips
 McKee Foods
 Mike-sell's
 Mrs. Fisher's
 Oberto Sausage Company
 Old Dutch Foods
 Robert's American Gourmet Food
 Rudolph Foods
 Shearer's Foods
 Snak King
 Snyder's-Lance
 Thanasi Foods
 Utz Quality Foods
 Wise Foods
 Wyandot Snacks

Spices & condiments 

 Badia Spices
 Basic Food Flavors
 Crystal Hot Sauce
 Dave's Gourmet
 Dog-Gone Sauce
 Frank's RedHot
 French's
 Frontier Natural Products Co-op
 Gold Pure Food Products Co.
 Herlocher Foods
 Huy Fong Foods
 J&D's Down Home Enterprises
 McCormick & Company
 Mezzetta
 Mrs. Cubbison's Foods
 Mt. Olive Pickle Company
 Odell's
 Plochman's
 Pompeian, Inc.
 Pure Indian Foods
 Reily Foods Company
 Silver Spring Foods
 Solo Foods
 Tabasco sauce
 Tapatío hot sauce
 Texas Pete
 Urban Accents
 Wickles
 Wing-Time

Sugar refining 
 Amalgamated Sugar Company
 American Crystal Sugar Company
 American Sugar Refining
 Michigan Sugar
 Spreckels Sugar Company
 US Sugar Corporation
 Western Sugar Cooperative

Worldwide 

 Campbell Soup Company
 The Coca-Cola Company
 ConAgra Foods
 General Mills
 Hain Celestial Group
 The Hershey Company
 Hormel
 Ingredion
 The J.M. Smucker Company
 Kellogg's
 Keurig Dr Pepper
 Kraft Heinz
 Mars, Incorporated
 McCormick & Company
 Monarch Beverage Company
 Mondelez International
 PepsiCo
 Post Holdings
 Rich Products
 Seaboard Corporation
 T. Marzetti Company
 Tootsie Roll Industries
 TreeHouse Foods
 Tyson Foods
 WhiteWave Foods
 Zevia

Venezuela 

 Alimentos La Giralda
 Chocolates El Rey
 Empresas Polar

Vietnam 

 An Giang Coffee
 Bien Hoa Sugar
 Cuulong Fish
 Habeco (Hanoi Beer)
 Hai Ha Confectionery
 Hanoimilk
 Highlands Coffee
 Huda Beer
 Hue Beer
 Kinh Do Corporation
 Sabeco (Saigon Beer)
 Trung Nguyên
 Vinacafe
 Vinamilk

See also 

 List of bakeries
 List of brand name food products
 List of food cooperatives

Companies

Food